O Kerstnacht, schoner dan de dagen (O Christmas Night, more beautiful than any day!) is a Dutch hymn that is usually referred to as a Christmas carol, although it does not refer to the birth of Jesus, but rather to the infanticide in Bethlehem. The poet and playwright Joost van den Vondel wrote it for the opening of the theatre Schouwburg of Van Campen in Amsterdam, the stage work Gijsbrecht van Aemstel, whose première was around Christmas 1637. It contains this song as a dance.

Following the example of Greek choral singing, van Vondel completed the act with spoken or sung lyrical reflections, which are detached from the actual action. The third act ends with this song sung by nuns "Rey van Clarissen" (reydance of the Poor Clares). (Gijsbrecht, vs. 904 – 950)

The dance later came to have a life of its own as a hymn in the Christmas environment.
In 1644, it was included in the Livre Septième.

It is not clear who was the composer of the melody and the polyphonic phrase, but they were alternately attributed to Cornelis Padbrué or Dirk Janszoon Sweelinck.

Also in the 20th century, there were still arrangements of the song, including one for four-part church choir by Gaston Feremans and an adaptation by the Dutch church musician Jan van Biezen. Because he did not appreciate the common version – he found the octave jump on "Kerstnacht" inappropriate – he wrote in 1973 a new version of the tune for the "Liedboek voor de Kerken".

The song gained a degree of fame by the progressive rock band Focus, who in 1974 incorporated the first two verses of the song in their composition Hamburger Concerto, where it can be heard at around 15 minutes into the piece.

The text of the first three stanzas – here reproduced in the original spelling of Joost van den Vondels – are:

In the Liedboek voor de Kerken (church hymnal), five of the eight verses were recorded.
The proposition Wat kan de blind staatzucht brouwen wanneer ze raast uit misvertrouwen ('What can lust for blind power do if it rages with mistrust') from the 7th stanza is regularly cited in Dutch to describe tyranny and brutal politics.

External links 
 
O Kerstnacht by the Dutch band Focus

O, kerstnacht schoner dan de dagen im rkk.nl (in Dutch)

References

Christmas carols
Dutch Christian hymns
1637 in music
17th-century hymns